is a former Nippon Professional Baseball outfielder.

External links

1975 births
Living people
Baseball people from Saga Prefecture
Japanese baseball players
Nippon Professional Baseball outfielders
Hiroshima Toyo Carp players
Seibu Lions players
Tokyo Yakult Swallows players
Japanese baseball coaches
Nippon Professional Baseball coaches